National Route 47 is a national highway of Japan connecting Miyagino-ku, Sendai and Sakata, Yamagata.

Route data
Length: 173.6 km (107.87 mi).

History
Route 47 was originally designated on 18 May 1953 as a section of Route 108; this was redesignated as Route 47 when the route was promoted to a Class 1 highway.

References

047
Roads in Miyagi Prefecture
Roads in Yamagata Prefecture